The 18th Producers Guild of America Awards (also known as 2007 Producers Guild Awards), honoring the best film and television producers of 2006, were held at The Century Plaza Hotel in Los Angeles, California on January 20, 2007. The nominations were announced on December 4, 2006, and January 3, 2007.

Winners and nominees

Film
{| class=wikitable style="width="100%"
|-
! colspan="2" style="background:#abcdef;"| Darryl F. Zanuck Award for Outstanding Producer of Theatrical Motion Pictures
|-
| colspan="2" style="vertical-align:top;"|
 Little Miss Sunshine – Albert Berger, David T. Friendly, Peter Saraf, Marc Turtletaub, and Ron Yerxa Babel – Steve Golin, Alejandro González Iñárritu, and Jon Kilik
 The Departed – Graham King
 Dreamgirls – Laurence Mark
 The Queen – Andy Harries, Christine Langan, and Tracey Seaward
|-
! colspan="2" style="background:#abcdef;"| Outstanding Producer of Animated Theatrical Motion Pictures
|-
| colspan="2" style="vertical-align:top;"|
 Cars – Darla K. Anderson Flushed Away – Cecil Kramer and Peter Lord
 Happy Feet – Bill Miller, George Miller, and Doug Mitchell
 Ice Age: The Meltdown – Lori Forte
 Monster House – Jack Rapke and Steve Starkey
|}

Television

David O. Selznick Achievement Award in Theatrical Motion PicturesDouglas Wick and Lucy FisherMilestone AwardRonald MeyerNorman Lear Achievement Award in TelevisionJerry BruckheimerStanley Kramer Award
Awarded to the motion picture that best illuminates social issues.An Inconvenient Truth

Vanguard Award
Awarded in recognition of outstanding achievement in new media and technology.
Will Wright

Visionary Award
Honored to a producer exemplifying unique or uplifting quality.
Kenneth Ehrlich

References

 2006
2006 film awards
2006 guild awards
2006 television awards